Joy: A Holiday Collection is the third studio album and first Christmas album by American singer-songwriter Jewel, released on November 2, 1999, through Atlantic Records. The radio-only single, "Joy to the World", was released in November the same year. Described as "an unashamed classicist Christmas album, featuring all of the usual carols delivered with strings and choirs", the album received platinum certifications in December 1999, and has sold 1,121,000 copies as of October 2013.

Track listing

Personnel
Credits adapted from AllMusic.

Musicians
Jewel – vocals, harmony vocals
Tawatha Agee – choir, chorus
Andre Baranowski
Terrance L. Barber Jr. – choir, chorus
Jerry Barnes – bass guitar, choir, chorus
Katreese Barnes – choir, chorus
Marion Beckenstein – choir, chorus
Peter Bliss – guitar
Danny Blume – guitar
Ann Ory Brown – choir, chorus
Sophie Buskin – children's chorus
Larry Campbell – pedal steel guitar
Sterling Campbell – drums
Lenedra Carroll – vocals, harmony vocals
Vivian Cherry – choir, chorus
Dennis Cinelli – lute
Angela Clemmons-Patrick – choir, chorus
Dennis Collins – choir, chorus
Patrick Duffey – children's chorus
Emily K. Eyre – choir, chorus
Keith Fluitt – choir, chorus
Gloria Gabriel – coordination
Katie Geissinger – choir, chorus
Diva Gray – choir, chorus
Wayne Hankin – choir, chorus
Netousha Harris – children's chorus
Alexis Kaleoff – children's chorus
Robbie Kondor – piano, keyboard
Mary Lee Kortes – background vocals, choir, chorus
Robbi Kumalo – choir, chorus
Cassidy Ladden – children's chorus
John Mahoney – keyboard

Arif Mardin – keyboard
Joe Mardin – keyboard, choir, chorus
Audrey Martells – choir, chorus
Willie Martinez – percussion
Chieli Minucci – guitar
Lee Musiker – keyboard
Michael O'Reilly – guitar
Gene Orloff – concertmaster
Wayne Pedzwater – bass guitar
Shawn Pelton – drums
Janice Pendarvis – choir, chorus
Leon Pendarvis – piano
Sophia Ramos – background vocals, choir, chorus
Eden Riegel – children's chorus
Winston Roye – bass guitar
Dakota Sanchez – children's chorus
Marlon Saunders – choir, chorus
Ira Siegel – guitar
Steve Skinner – keyboard
Allison M. Sniffin – choir, chorus
Elizabeth Stockton
Vaneese Thomas – choir, chorus
Fonzi Thornton – choir, chorus
Darryl Tookes – choir, chorus
Christopher Trousdale – children's chorus
Lori Ann Velez – choir, chorus
Audrey Wheeler – choir, chorus
James D-Train Williams – choir, chorus
Ken Williams – choir, chorus
Valerie Wilson – background vocals, choir, chorus
Lisbeth Zelle – children's chorus
Harry Zittel – children's chorus

Technical
Jewel – vocal arrangement
Arif Mardin – record producer, arranger, choir arrangement, conductor, orchestration, string arrangements, vocal arrangement
Joe Mardin – arranger, choir arrangement, conductor, orchestration, production, programming, vocal arrangement
Jerry Barnes – choir arrangement, vocal arrangement
Katreese Barnes – choir arrangement, vocal arrangement
Jennifer Baumann – photography
Lenedra Carroll – vocal arrangement
Rob Eberhardt – illustrations
Max Feldman – assistant engineer
Gloria Gabriel – production, production coordination
West Kennerly – photography
Robbie Kondor – orchestration, programming, synthesizer programming
George Marino – mastering
Lee Musiker – arranger
Benjamin Niles – art direction, artwork
Michael O'Reilly – engineer, mixing
Gene Orloff – concertmaster
Steve Skinner – arranger, orchestration, programming, synthesizer programming
Jason Stasium – assistant engineer

Chart performance

End-of-year charts

Certifications

|}

References

Jewel (singer) albums
Albums produced by Arif Mardin
Atlantic Records albums
1999 Christmas albums
Christmas albums by American artists
Folk rock Christmas albums
Pop rock Christmas albums